The Last Dragon: Original Soundtrack Album is a soundtrack album for the 1985 movie The Last Dragon starring Taimak, Julius Carry, Vanity and Christopher Murney. The music soundtrack album was supervised by executive producer Berry Gordy, the founder of Motown Records.

The soundtrack features the DeBarge’s hit song, "Rhythm of the Night", written by Diane Warren. The song reached top five on the Billboard Hot 100 and #1 on the Billboard R&B Singles. Also included is new music by singers’ Stevie Wonder, Smokey Robinson, and the film's star, Vanity; as well as various artists from the Motown label. The soundtrack also features songwriting from Norman Whitfield, who had left Motown in 1975 and set up his own record company, and returned to Motown in the early 1980s.

Track listing
US Vinyl LP Album

Charts

Singles

Credits
Executive Producer – Berry Gordy
Mastered by – John Matousek
Mastered By [Digitally Remastered] – Suha Gur

Mastered at Motown / Hitsville USA Recording Studios, Hollywood, CaliforniaDigitally remastered by Suha Gur at Universal Mastering Studios-East. Researched and supervised by Harry Weinger.

References

External links
 
 

Comedy film soundtracks
Funk soundtracks
Pop soundtracks
Soul soundtracks
1985 soundtrack albums
Motown soundtracks